Emiliano Bucci (born May 30, 1974) is a pianist, piano teacher, musicology doctor, electronic composer, sound engineer, a highly appreciated music professor in a public school, and a filmmaker.

His Life 
Emiliano Bucci was born in Avezzano, L'Aquila, Italy. He began to study music at an early age and was initially taught by his father, the Italian songwriter Antenore Bucci.
After obtaining his scientific licence, comprising Conservatory studies, first in L'Aquila and then at the Accademia Nazionale di Santa Cecilia in Rome, he left his own city, Capistrello, in order to study at the Milan Conservatory. In 1996, he began studying experimental music composition with Bruno Zanolini, whilst continuing to study traditional composition with Danilo Lorenzini. At the same time, he also studied privately with Bruno Bettinelli, the teacher of Claudio Abbado, Maurizio Pollini, and Riccardo Muti. In 1997, he obtained his diploma in pianoforte under the guidance of Leonardo Leonardi, first pianist of Salvatore Accardo. He began the course of specialization in piano in 2001, guided by Paolo Bordoni, at the Pescara musical high academy. In 2003, tutored by Riccardo Sinigaglia, Bucci obtained the diploma in electronic music. In the 2003 bachelor in four-year Musicology in the only Italian University to declare this title, Pavia, last School of paleography and musical Filologia in Cremona. Its thesis of the bachelor, unknown and most original: "the scientific observation in the pianistic Didactics. The Deppesche Lehre of Elisabeth Caland: introduction, translation and comment".
In 2005 university specialization for the instruction in the public schools, medium and advanced schools, the SILSIS, in Cremona. Two thesis: one on the instruction of electronic music at the school and one on the realization of a complete short-films at the school.
In 2005 he begins and he finishes the course of specialization "Film Maker " at the IED Communications of Milan, under the guide of numerous experts of the field between which the director Fabio Scamoni, attendance of Gabriele Salvatores.
In 2006 the diploma of audio engineer at the SAE Institute of Milan, with teaching of Filippo Gabbrielli for example. The thesis on Disklavier piano has received good appreciations.

Musical career 
During the studies and after these, he begins to make series of concerts in North of Italy.
His first concert in 1991, in the scientific liceum high school "Vitruvio Pollione" of Avezzano with all students and teachers (he was 16 years old).
In 1997 the Conservatory of Milan choose him for the interpretation of Pieces for piano of Bruno Bettinelli, in presence of all teachers, students, people and of the same composer. At Cremona, between 2000 and 2002, he makes series of Concerts, also for beneficence, in presence of some local important people. He played at Milan in the Asteria Center, in 1995. He makes a concert at Acqui Terme, in 2004, a concert of improvisation and electronic music with masters Alzek Misheff and Rocco Parisi.
In 2005 he participates in two concerts in PAC of Milan (Pavilion of Contemporary Art), with Alzek Misheff (piano Disklavier) and Eugen Sarbu (Stradivari violin), playing  4 portable telephones "Vertu". "Patek Philippe" and "Pisa Orologeria" were the sponsors.
In the 2006 he played the piano, with pieces of Frédéric Chopin, in the Auditorium in the Bocconi University (Milan), for the commemoration of Francesco Attanasi, with the special participation of the Negramaro Italian group and Placido actor. His electronic composition "Total piano" for Disklavier piano, quadraphonic electronic music and voice, inaugurated Napoli Piano City 2014 with presentation of big pianist Roberto Prosseda.

Currently teaches in public medium and advanced schools, and he is titular of a musical production Studio, the Fonorecord Studio near Rome, where teaches piano and electronic music, creates video, writes songs, produces CD etc. Member of SIM (Italian Musicology Society). Many times national television, RAI 1, has made television services in the studio Fonorecord and he was invited many times from television with the priest singer Don Elvis, studio client, for example vip episode of sunday in Canale 5 presented by Paolo Bonolis; Emiliano Bucci's video, "Water", was transmitted by RAI 2 in the first day of new year and by "La Repubblica" online journal.

He has taught four different matters of the new Italian "musical high school" with annual competitions: music history, ensemble musical scores, piano and musical technologies (the only teacher who did this in Italy). He has taught two matters of the scientific "M.V.Pollione" high school: piano and Musical technologies; also orchestral proof. In 2015 she was delegated by the school manager to represent him at the conference of the school managers of the musical high schools in Rome 3 University.

Bibliography 
"The scientific observation in the pianistic Didactics. The Deppesche Lehre of Elisabeth Caland: introduction, translation and comment". Pavia University, Faculty of Musicology, Cremona, 2003.

"The Disklavier piano". SAE Institute, Milano, 2006

Discography 
Various CDs produced for piano solo, and piano with jazz orchestra. The Fabio Turchetti and Django's clan "swing swing swing" as sound engineer, Don Elvis' (Don Antoniu Petrescu) "Christmas' songs", Gianluca Lusi's jazz band (Live concerts), Emiliano Branda's "L'essenza" (RAI trade), Paolo Cerasoli and ORF orchestra (Live in Casalbordino), Paolo Bordoni (piano recordings Swiss radio, Menotti and Gershwin's concerts), Emiliano Bucci ("piano@Fonorecord"), Ianieri Edition (CD with the  book "La musica sacra nella provincia dell'Aquila"); he recorded for Sisko production audio from concert in "Teatro dei Marsi" in Avezzano, musicians like Fabrizio Bosso and Stefano Di Battista; he recorded in studio Massimo Moriconi and Ellade Bandini; he recorded the CD for the Aquila Altera Ensemble produced by Tactus and distributed all around the world; he mastered "Archi del Cherubino" ensemble new CD of Albinoni's Symphonies; he recorded Don Elvis CDs in country style too etc.

References

External and related Links 
  Official artist site
 Artist audio demo
 Europass italian curriculum
 All MUSIC verified credits
 Antenore Bucci web site
 Official site of Alzek Misheff
 Prix "terre di puglia", Bocconi concerts
 F.Busoni articles
 Emiliano Bucci's professional video
 Emiliano Bucci's CDs

Italian musicologists
Italian audio engineers
Living people
1974 births
People from Avezzano